The chiefs of the Scottish highland Clan Mackenzie were historically known as the Mackenzies of Kintail. By tradition the Mackenzie chiefs descend from Kenneth Mackenzie, 1st of Kintail (d. 1304) however their earliest ancestor proven by contemporary evidence is Alexander Mackenzie, 6th of Kintail (d. 1488). The chiefly line became the Earls of Seaforth during the 17th century but this title was later forfeited in the 18th century due to support of the Jacobite rising of 1715. The current official chief of the Clan Mackenzie is John Ruaridh Grant Mackenzie, 5th Earl of Cromartie.

Chiefs – the Caberféidh

The Blunt-Mackenzies
The current chief is  John Ruaridh Grant Mackenzie, 5th Earl of Cromartie. His father was Ruaridh Grant Francis Blunt-Mackenzie, 4th Earl of Cromartie, who legally changed his surname to Mackenzie and was appointed chief of Clan Mackenzie by the Lord Lyon King of Arms in 1979. He therefore is the second modern 'chief'. Ruaridh was born a Blunt and later changed to Blunt-Mackenzie. His mother Sibell Lilian Sutherland-Leveson-Gower, Countess of Cromartie, married Colonel Blunt, and he inherited his titles and Mackenzie descent through her. (Even she only claims a Mackenzie descent as a great-great-great-great-granddaughter of George Mackenzie, 3rd Earl of Cromartie). The Earl of Cromartie still owns lands in clan country, however the largest remaining Mackenzie landowner by some margin is Mackenzie of Gairloch, with an estate which extends to over 50,000 acres. Like the clan chief, Mackenzie of Gairloch has inherited his clan name and lands through the female line. The last acknowledged chief through agnatic seniority (i.e. male sibling descent) was James Fowler Mackenzie, VIth of Allangrange (died 1907).

Ancestry

Direct descent through female line
The following is a list of some of the previous clan chiefs as listed by Alexander Mackenzie in his book A History of the Clan Mackenzie, published 1890. The last three, cited here, are disputed and the acknowledged chiefs were the Mackenzies of Allangrange; George Falconer Mackenzie, IVth of Allangrange; his son, John F.; and his younger brother, James Fowler Mackenzie (died 1907).

Historical undisputed line

Traditional chiefs

Direct descent through male line
The question of the legitimate heir-male of the Mackenzie Clan chiefs is most contentious: the Mackenzies of Allangrange were acknowledged as chiefs, both by election (in 1829, of George F. Mackenzie by jury) and being considered the heirs-male of the clan by the Lord Lyon, as their progenitor was Simon Mackenzie of Lochslinn. Colin Cam Mackenzie's son, Kenneth Mor Mackenzie, Lord Mackenzie of Kintail, was father to both Colin (1st Earl of Seaforth), George (2nd Earl) and Simon of Lochslinn, (his seventh son).

Colin Cam Mackenzie was father of Alexander Mackenzie, of Coul & Applecross, who was in turn, father of Hector Mackenzie, of Assynt (extinct); Roderick Mackenzie, 1st of Applecross (extinct); and Kenneth Mackenzie, 1st Bart of Coul (Peter Douglas Mackenzie, XIIIth Bart. of Coul, Ross, 28 Jul 1990). Alexander Mackenzie, of Coul & Applecross was a 'natural son' i.e., illegitimate.

Colin Cam Mackenzie other sons included; Kenneth Mor Mackenzie, Lord Mackenzie of Kintail, who succeeded his father as Chief and from whom the Earls of Seaforth, acknowledged Chiefs of Clan Mackenzie, spring; Colin Mackenzie, of Kennock & Pitlundie; Murdoch Mackenzie, 1st of Kernsary; and the aforementioned Roderick (Sir) Mackenzie, Knight of Tarbat (Roderick of Coigeach, the "Tutor of Kintail"), from whom the Earls of Cromartie and the current Chief (in the female line), descends; Roderick (Sir) Mackenzie, Knight of Tarbat (ancestor of the Earls of Cromartie and Mackenzies of Scatwell); and Alexander Mackenzie, 1st of Kilcoy.

The Mackenzies of Scatwell claim descent through Kenneth Mackenzie, 1st of Scatwell, younger brother of John (Sir) Mackenzie, 1st Bt of Tarbat and father of George (Sir) Mackenzie, 1st Earl Cromartie (through whom the present Chiefs descends in the female line). The head of the Mackenzies of Scatwell, Tarbat is Dashwood George Roderick Barrett Mackenzie, 14th Baronet.

The Mackenzies of Kilcoy, descended from Roderick (Sir) Mackenzie, Knight of Tarbat's younger brother Alexander Mackenzie, 1st of Kilcoy and from whom the families of Kilcoy (extinct), Inverallochy, Findon (extinct), Kinnoch, Kernsary, Muirton (extinct), and Cleanwaters are descended.

The Mackenzies of Redcastle (extinct) and cadet branches, Kincraig (extinct), descend from Roderick Mor Mackenzie, Baron of Redcastle, a younger brother of Colin Cam Mackenzie, 11th Baronet of Kintail.

The eldest cadet line of Kintail are the Mackenzies of Hilton.

According to A.M. Mackenzie's History of the Mackenzies:

The Mackenzies of Allangrange succeeded F.H. Mackenzie as chiefs, upon the latter's death in 1815.

The next collateral branch of Clan Mackenzies closest to the Allangrange family are The Old Mackenzies of Dundonnel, descended from the Hon. Simon Mackenzie of Lochslinn by his second wife, Agnes Fraser. The last of this branch was Thomas, the eighth of Dundonnel (old) and John Hope Mackenzie, third son of Thomas, (the sixth) predeceased him in 1892. The only members of this family whose descendants can ever now by any possibility succeed to the Chiefship should it pass from the Mackenzies of Allangrange are (1) Alexander, second son of Kenneth Mor, first of Dundonnel, but of him there is no trace for more than two hundred years, and never likely to be. (2) Simon, Alexander's youngest brother, of whom nothing has been heard during the same period. (3) Captain Alexander, of the 73rd Regiment, second son of Kenneth Mackenzie, II. of Dundonnel, who died, probably unmarried, in 1783. In any case there is nothing known of any descendants. (4) Kenneth, W.S., second son of Kenneth Mackenzie, III. of Dundonnel, who died in 1790, and is not known to have been married. (5) William, third son of the same Kenneth, an Episcopalian minister, who was married, and left issue, of whom, however, we know nothing. (6) Roderick, William's immediate younger brother, and third son of the same Kenneth Mackenzie, III. of Dundonnel, who was also married, with issue, but whether extinct or not we cannot say. (7) Captain Simon, who was married and died in Nairn in 1812, but of his descendants, if any, we at present know nothing. (8) Captain Lewis, who died in India, probably, unmarried, but this has not been conclusively established; and (9) Thomas, second son of Thomas, VI. of Dundonnel, who in early life emigrated to California, and regarding whom nothing has since been heard. If he is still alive or has left any surviving male issue the late John Hope Mackenzie could not have succeeded as head of the family, and Thomas, or his male heir, if now in life, occupies that position; and on the failure of the Mackenzies of Allangrange, he or his representative will become Chief of the Mackenzies. The male line of the Allangrange, family became extinct in 1907 by the death of James Fowler Mackenzie. He entailed his, estates on the respondent, who was it cousin and had married it Fraser of Bunchrew. The entail contained a name and arms clause binding the heirs of entail to assume the name and bear the arms of Mackenzie of Allangrange.

The eldest cadet branch of Clan Kenneth are Mackenzies of Hilton, descended from Alexander Mackenzie, VI. of Kintail, known among the Highlanders as "Alastair Ionraic". His only son and heir, Allan Mackenzie, second of Hilton, Loggie or Brea, from whom the family is known in Gaelic as "Clann Alain", but by his second son John, Mackenzies of Loggie. The main line was extinct upon the death of Alexander Mackenzies, 10th of Hilton and was succeeded by Roderick Mackenzie, I. of Brea, Chamberlain of Ferintosh, second son of Colin, by his wife Mary Simpson, third son of Murdoch, V. of Hilton, all the intermediate male heirs having, as has been shown, become extinct. XIV. Kenneth Mackenzie, who recently resided at Tyrl-Tyrl, Taralga, near Sydney, New South Wales. He married his cousin, Mary James, daughter of Captain Alexander Mackenzie of Brea, second son of Alexander, XI. of Hilton, with issue including sons John (heir) and Downie, in Australia at the turn of the 19th century.

The Mackenzies of Glack are descended from Roderick, second son of Colin, third son of Murdoch Mackenzie, V. of Hilton, or rather from his second son. Roderick, Chamberlain of the Lewis. This Roderick had three sons—(1) John Mackenzie, I. of Brea, who carried on the male line of Hilton; (2) Colin, from whom the Mackenzies of Glack. The Rev. Duncan Campbell Mackenzie, Vicar of Shephall, Herts, 5th of Glack who was born on 6 January 1824, and married on 31 January 1854, Louisa, daughter of the late Lieutenant-Colonel Nicolls, of Chichester, with issue—1. Donald, an officer in the Marines. 2. Allan, an officer in the Ross-shire Militia, later Mackenzie-Penderel and 3. Malcolm.

The Mackenzies of Loggie: extinct

The Mackenzies of Gairloch are descended from Alexander Mackenzie, VI. of Kintail, by his second wife Margaret, daughter of Roderick Macdonald, III. of Moydart and Clanranald, the famous "Ruairidh MacAlain". Sir Hector David Mackenzie, 8th Baronet, assumed the surname Inglis. His grandson Sir Roderick John Inglis is 10th Baronet. Other branches of the Mackenzies of Gairloch include:

See also
Kermac Macmaghan, apparent ancestor of the clan

References

Chiefs
Mackenzie
Clan Mackenzie Chiefs